Marcantoni is a surname. Notable people with the surname include:

Benjamín Marcantoni, Puerto Rican opera singer, actor and composer
François Marcantoni (1920–2010), Corsican gangster, member of French resistance, bank robber and writer
Jonathan Marcantoni, American novelist, screenwriter, and editor